Frank McGrath may refer to:

 Frank McGrath (actor) (1903–1967), American television actor
 Frank McGrath (footballer) (1917–2008), Australian rules footballer
 Frank McGrath (hurler) (1885–?), Irish hurler and manager
 Frank McGrath (bodybuilder) (born 1978), IFBB professional bodybuilder
 Frank McGrath (American football) (1904–1990), American football player